The Poganovo Monastery is a Serbian Orthodox monastery situated in the gorges of the river Jerma, near the village Poganovo, municipality of Dimitrovgrad, Serbia.

According to some sources the frescoes were made by masters from Northern Greece. Frescoes inscriptions are in Church Slavonic language.

Poganovo Monastery was protected by Serbia since 1949, and declared Monument of Culture of Great Importance in 1979, and it is protected by Republic of Serbia.

See also 
 Monuments of Culture of Great Importance
 Tourism in Serbia

References

Further reading
 Pentcheva, B. Imagined Images: Visions of Salvation and Intercession in a Double-Sided Icon from Poganovo. - Dumbarton Oaks Papers 54 (2000), 139-153.
 The Double-Sided Icon from Poganovo (Plates)
 Walter, Chr. The Iconography of the Prophet Habakkuk - Revue des études byzantines, T. 47 (1989), pp. 251-260

External links

Cultural Monuments of Great Importance (Serbia)
Architecture in Serbia
Serbian Orthodox monasteries in Serbia
Christian monasteries established in the 14th century
14th-century Serbian Orthodox church buildings
Tourist attractions in Serbia
Landmarks in Serbia
Buildings and structures in Pirot